Ahmad Al-Semaiti (Arabic:أحمد السميطي) (born 11 April 1992) is a Qatari footballer who plays as a midfielder .

Career
Al-Semaiti started his career at Al-Wakrah and is a product of the Al-Wakrah's youth system. On 19 November 2012, Al Sumaiti made his professional debut for Al-Wakrah against Al-Sadd in the Pro League, replacing Anouar Diba . On 3 August 2017, he left Al-Wakrah and signed with Al-Arabi. On 30 September 2017, Al Sumaiti made his professional debut for Al-Arabi against Qatar SC in the Pro League . Then play in Mesaimeer and Al-Waab.

External links

References

Living people
1992 births
Qatari footballers
Al-Wakrah SC players
Al-Arabi SC (Qatar) players
Mesaimeer SC players
Al-Waab SC players
Qatar Stars League players
Qatari Second Division players
Association football midfielders
Place of birth missing (living people)